The Maryland Office of the State Fire Marshal (OSFM) actively works in 17 of 23 Maryland counties. It works under the Department of State Police.  The State Fire Marshal shall appoint Assistant State Fire Marshals, Special Assistant State Fire Marshals, and Deputy State Fire Marshals as he/she deems appropriate.

Duties
Per the Maryland State Public Safety Article, Title 6, Sub-title 3, section 05, the State Fire Marshal shall enforce all laws and statutes of the state of Maryland that relate to the following:
the prevention of fire.
the storage, sale, and usage of explosives, combustibles, or other dangerous articles, in solid, liquid, or gaseous form.
the installation and maintenance of all kinds of equipment intended to control, detect, or extinguish fire.
the means and adequacy of exit, in case of fire, from buildings and all other places in which individuals work, live, or congregate, except buildings that are used solely as dwelling houses for no more than two families.
the suppression of arson and the regulations adopted by the Commission under Subtitle 2 of this title.

Qualifications
The State Fire Marshal shall be appointed by the Secretary from a list of three candidates given by the commission.

(Per § 6–302. State Fire Marshal.) The appointed Maryland State Fire Marshal shall minimally have the following:
a degree from an accredited college or university.
have 5 years of recent progressively responsible experience, at least 3 years of which shall have been at the administrative level, in fire prevention inspection, fire investigation, fire safety promotion, fire protection engineering, fire fighting, or teaching fire safety engineering.

See also 

 List of law enforcement agencies in Maryland
 Fire departments in Maryland

References

External links
Maryland Office of the State Fire Marshal homepage

State law enforcement agencies of Maryland